The Pokrovsky Gate is a 1982 Soviet comedy film produced for television by Mosfilm.  It was directed by Mikhail Kozakov and stars Oleg Menshikov, Leonid Bronevoy, and Inna Ulyanova. The screenplay is based on a 1974 stage play by Leonid Zorin.

Featured in the film are three songs written and performed by renowned "bard" Bulat Okudzhava:  "Chasovye Lyubvi" ("Sentries of Love"), "Zhivopistsy" ("Painters"), and "Pesenka ob Arbate" ("Ditty about Arbat").

The title refers to a square on Moscow's Boulevard Ring near which the film's main characters reside.

Plot
The story takes place in the 1950s.  Konstantin “Kostik” Romin (Oleg Menshikov) has come to Moscow to study history and is staying with kindly aunt Alisa, who lives in a "communal apartment" building there. His life soon becomes intertwined with those of the other residents. Among them are Margarita Pavlovna (Inna Ulyanova) and both her former husband Lev Khobotov (Anatoly Ravikovich), a publisher of foreign poetry, and her new beau, World War II veteran and engraver-turned-teacher Savva Ignatevich (Viktor Bortsov).

The main plot revolves around the congenial Khobotov’s attempts to find happiness with newfound love Lyudochka (Yelena Koreneva), while constantly being thwarted by the controlling Margarita. Another tenant is musical comedian Arkady Velyurov (Leonid Bronevoy), who is trying to revive his faltering career and escape from his own loneliness. He has become enamored of a young competitive swimmer, Svetlana (Tatyana Dogileva), who rebuffs his advances but takes a fancy to the opportunistic Kostik.

Kostik finds his own love interest, Rita, for whom he decides to forsake his playboy lifestyle. In the end he becomes the catalyst for both Khobotov and Velyurov to find some measure of happiness: the former elopes with Lyudochka with the help of Kostik's pal Savransky, and the latter is elated that Svetlana attends one of his concerts in response to a telegram Kostik had urged him to send.

Main idea of the film

Quotation about the movie:

Cast

Other parts
Rimma Markova as doctor
Igor Dmitriev as Gleb Nikolaevich Orlovich
Natalia Krachkovskaya as Olga Yanovna Soyeva 
Mikhail Kazakov as Konstantin Romin, after 25 years
Emmanuil Geller as Savelich (voiced by Georgy Vitsin)
Sofya Pilyavskaya as aunt Alisa

References

External links

Detailed synopsis and discussion with many screen shots 
Complete text of Zorin play 
Пьесу легендарного драматурга покажут в московском театре 

Films set in the 1960s
1982 films
Mosfilm films
1980s Russian-language films
1982 comedy films
Russian comedy films
Soviet comedy films
Films set in 1956
Films set in 1957
Films set in Moscow
Films set in the Soviet Union
Films shot in Moscow
Films set in hospitals